This is a list of video games for the Wii video game console that have sold or shipped at least one million copies. The best-selling game on the Wii is Wii Sports. First released in North America on November 19, 2006, it was a launch title for the system and was bundled with the Wii console in all regions except Japan and South Korea. The game went on to sell nearly 83 million units worldwide making it the fourth-best-selling video game of all time and is also the best-selling game released on a single console. Mario Kart Wii is the second-best-selling game on the platform with sales of 37.38 million units, it is the second best-selling iteration in the Mario Kart series, behind Mario Kart 8 Deluxe. The third-best-selling game is Wii Sports Resort, a sequel to Wii Sports, with sales of 33.14million units. The console's top five is rounded out by New Super Mario Bros. Wii, which sold 30.32million units and Wii Play, which sold just over 28million units worldwide.

There are a total of 63 Wii games on this list which are confirmed to have sold or shipped at least one million units. Of these, 21 were developed by internal Nintendo development divisions. Other developers with the most million-selling games include Ubisoft Paris with five games and Capcom and Sega Sports R&D, with three games each in the list of 63. Of the 63 games on this list, 42 were published in one or more regions by Nintendo. Other publishers with multiple million-selling games include Ubisoft with six games and Activision and Capcom with three games each. The most popular franchises on Wii include the Wii video game series (157.53million combined units), Super Mario (53.77 million combined units), Wii Fit (43.8million combined units), Mario Kart (37.38million combined units), and Mario & Sonic (16.02million combined units).

By March 31, 2021, over 921.85million total copies of games had been sold for the Wii. By December 31, 2007, sales of Virtual Console games had reached over 10million copies. As of March 31, 2019, there are a total of 103 Wii games that have sold at least one million units.

List

Notes

References

External links
 Nintendo IR Information - Wii Software

 
Wii
Best-selling Wii video games